Murphy is an unincorporated village in, and county seat of, Owyhee County, Idaho, United States.  It is among the smallest of county seats nationwide, with a population as of the 2020 census of 96. Murphy is part of the Boise City–Nampa, Idaho Metropolitan Statistical Area.  Murphy is also located within the census-designated place bearing its name. Murphy is home to the Owyhee County Historical Museum and Library.

History
Murphy developed around a railhead of the Boise, Nampa and Owyhee Railroad, built in 1899 by Colonel William H. Dewey. Dewey had planned to extend the railroad to Silver City, but when mining operations in the Owyhee Mountains became unproductive, the line was not continued past Murphy. The railroad operated until 1947.

By a narrow margin, Owyhee County voters selected Murphy as county seat in 1934, succeeding Silver City (which was located in the Owyhee Mountains and had been in decline; it is now defunct). Although the county seat was moved to Murphy after the vote, and a new Owyhee County Courthouse was constructed in 1936, the Idaho State Legislature did not ratify the change of county seat until 1999. The error in the Idaho Code, discovered by county prosecutor G. Edward Yarbrough, was finally corrected by Senate Bill 1009.

The community likely was named after Cornelius "Con" Murphy, a crew boss with the Boise, Nampa and Owyhee Railroad and foreman during construction of the Guffey Bridge in 1897. Another source for the name may have been Pat Murphy, a Silver City mining engineer and friend of railroad owner Dewey.

Murphy's population was estimated at 100 in 1909, and was 50 in 1960.

Geography

Climate
According to the Köppen climate classification, Murphy has a cold semi arid climate (BSk).

Airstrip
Murphy's airstrip is situated immediately northeast of the community, without a control tower. Its  asphalt runway is oriented NW-SE (12/30), parallel with State Highway 78. The elevation drops  in the northwest (30) direction, from 2,855 to 2,795 feet.

References

External links

Owyhee County Historical Society - Museum & Library - Murphy, Idaho
Untraveled Road.com - photo tour - Murphy, Idaho - 2008-06-13
Weather.com - Murphy, Idaho - current conditions and forecast

Census-designated places in Idaho
Census-designated places in Owyhee County, Idaho
County seats in Idaho
Boise metropolitan area